The North Wales Crusaders is a professional rugby league club based in Colwyn Bay, Wales. They are the successors to the former Super League club Crusaders Rugby League. Crusaders compete in Betfred League 1, the third tier of European rugby league (behind the Super League and Betfred Championship). Until the end of 2016 they played their home games at the Racecourse Ground in Wrexham. From 2017 to 2020 they were based at the Queensway Stadium in Wrexham, but also played several games at Hare Lane in Chester.  In 2021 the club moved to the Eirias Stadium in Colwyn Bay.

History

Celtic Warriors
In the summer of 2003, the WRU voted to reduce the top tier of Welsh professional rugby union from nine clubs into five regions. The Celtic Warriors officially represented the Mid-Glamorgan Valleys area, which in practice meant that they were a combination of Pontypridd RFC and Bridgend RFC.

Financial problems at Pontypridd RFC led to the sale of their half of the Warriors to Bridgend RFC owner Leighton Samuel, which he gifted to the WRU. He then later sold his half to the WRU who in the summer of 2004 decided to liquidate the club.

Celtic Crusaders

Leighton Samuel was approached by the RFL to form a rugby league club and join the professional ranks. The new Celtic Crusaders were argued to be a continuation of the old Celtic Warriors side and were based at Bridgend's Brewery Field.

In 2009, the team were awarded a Super League licence and played one season in Super League before financial problems saw the club renamed Crusaders Rugby League and moved to Wrexham. The club created an academy side for players based in North Wales known as North Wales Crusaders. After two seasons at Wrexham, the club pulled out from bidding for a 2012 Super League licence.

North Wales Crusaders

The club was founded in 2011 following the folding of Crusaders Rugby League. They officially joined Championship 1, the third tier of rugby league in the United Kingdom, on 11 October 2011. Their name, which continues the Crusaders branding, was selected in a fan contest. A rival bid from Wrexham-based Glyndwr Chargers was withdrawn.

The club held open trials for any new players to attend.

North Wales Crusaders won their first game, a friendly, 34–12 away to Leigh East.

Symbols

The club have revealed a logo ready for use in the 2012 season which an evolution of the 2011 logo. The badge, inspired by the Prince of Wales's feathers, has three white feathers adorning the centre of a disc with the Flag of St David on. To the left and right of the feathers, the words "North" and "Wales" appear on the disc as opposed to "Rugby" and "League" on the old logo. Beneath the feathers remains "Crusaders".

Stadiums

North Wales Crusaders were first based at the Racecourse Ground located in Wrexham. The club moved to the ground in 2010, in time for the start of the Super League XV season. The first Crusaders match ever played there was against Leeds Rhinos on 29 January 2010, and that match is also the highest attendance for a Crusaders match played in Wrexham. With a capacity of 15,500 it is the largest ground in North Wales, the fifth largest in the whole of Wales, and the seventh largest in Super League. It was first built in 1807 and first played host to Wrexham's "Town Purse" horse race. Crowd trouble stopped the horse racing and in 1864 it became home to Wrexham Football Club with the club now owning the ground. The Wales national rugby league team have played there. The ground has four stands: The Mold Road Stand, the Eric Roberts Stand, the Kop and the Yale.

During pre-season of the 2012 campaign. North Wales Crusaders played 'Home' games at both Halton Stadium (Widnes) and Eirias Stadium (Colwyn Bay).

Whilst resurfacing work was taking place at the Racecourse Ground in 2014, North Wales Crusaders took their home games to 'the Rock' in Rhosymedre, near Ruabon.

As of the 2017 season, the club is based at the Queensway Stadium in Wrexham. It consists of two small all-seater stands on one side overlooking a rugby pitch and a running track with floodlights.

For 2021 the club is based at Eirias Stadium in Colwyn Bay as COVID-19 restrictions prevent the use of the Queensway Stadium.

2023 squad

2022 transfers

Gains

Losses

Players

Coaches

Updated 11 June 2015.

Seasons

Honours

Championship:
Runners-up (1): 2008
League 1:
Winners (2): 2007, 2013
League 1 Cup:
Winners (1): 2015
Runners-up (1): 2017

Statistics

References

External links
Official website

 
2011 establishments in Wales
Rugby clubs established in 2011
Welsh rugby league teams
Super League teams

cy:Croesgadwyr Rygbi'r Gynghrair
fr:Crusaders Rugby League